Tang is an American drink mix brand that was formulated by General Foods Corporation food scientist William A. Mitchell and General Foods Corporation chemist William Bruce James in 1957, and first marketed in powdered form in 1959. The Tang brand is currently owned in most countries by Mondelēz International, a 2012 North American company spun off from Kraft Foods. Kraft Heinz owns the Tang brand in North America.

Sales of Tang were poor until NASA used it on John Glenn's Mercury flight in February 1962, and on subsequent Gemini missions. Since then it has been closely associated with the U.S. human spaceflight program, which created the misconception that Tang was invented for the space program.

History
General Foods Corporation food scientist William A. Mitchell and chemist William Bruce James formulated and trademarked Tang in 1957. Tang entered test markets in 1958 and was available to the public beginning in 1959.

Tang was used by early NASA crewed space flights. In 1962, when Mercury astronaut John Glenn conducted eating experiments in orbit, Tang was selected for the menu; it was also used during some Gemini flights, and has also been carried aboard numerous space shuttle missions. Although many soda companies sent specially designed canned drinks into space with the crew of STS-51-F, the crew preferred to use Tang, as it could be mixed into existing water containers easily. In 2013, former NASA astronaut Buzz Aldrin said, "Tang sucks". In his autobiography, published forty years earlier, Aldrin had further clarified: "I can't speak for the other flights, but before (Apollo 11), the three of us dutifully sampled the orange drink, supposedly Tang, and instead chose a grapefruit-orange mixture as our citrus drink. If Tang was on our flight I was unaware of it."

The creator of Tang, William A. Mitchell, also invented Pop Rocks, Cool Whip, a form of instant-set Jell-O, and other convenience foods. Chemist William Bruce James also invented several Jell-O flavors.

Tang is noted for its advertising in the 1990s and early 2000s which featured the orangutan as a recurring theme.

Nutritional facts
Tang is sold in powdered and liquid-concentrate form. The suggested serving size is two tablespoons, or 31 grams of powdered Original Orange flavored Tang per  of water. A single suggested serving of Tang contains  of sugar (representing 94% of the product's dry weight); 10% RDA of carbohydrates;  100% RDA of vitamin C; 6% RDA of calcium and has a total of 120 calories (500 kJ).

Other versions
In 2007, Kraft introduced a new version of Tang which replaced half of the sugar with artificial sweeteners. The new packaging advertises  "1/2 the sugar of 100% juice". The artificial sweeteners used in the new formulation are sucralose, acesulfame potassium and neotame. The new formula is more concentrated and distributed in smaller containers, with a  making .

According to the preparation instructions on the 20 oz Tang orange drink mix, 2 level tablespoons of the Tang drink mix can be combined with 1 cup or 8 fl oz of cold water for 1 serving of the beverage.

In 2009, another version of Tang emerged in  containers making only .

Orange flavored Tang contributes to most sales worldwide; however, there are a wide range of flavors of Tang offered globally. Some of these flavors include grape, lemon, mango, pineapple, and many more.

Sales 
Tang is sold in about thirty-five countries and is available in a variety of flavors depending on location. The top three markets for Tang around the world are Brazil, Argentina, and the Philippines.

In the Middle East, more than half of Tang's annual sales occur in just six weeks around Ramadan.

In June 2011, Kraft Foods announced that Tang has become its twelfth billion-dollar brand, with global sales nearly doubling since 2006. The brand in 2010 controlled a category-best 15.6% of the international powder concentrate market although, like other highly processed or sweetened beverages, demand in developed economies has stagnated or fallen in line with consumers increasing preference for lower calorie drinks. In 2018, Tang's manufacturer Mondelez reported a drop in sales following the introduction of tax on calorific sweetened beverages in the Philippines.

See also 
 Instant breakfast
 Kool-Aid

References

External links
  
 TANG 2017 Fact Sheet PDF

Products introduced in 1957
American drinks
Mondelez International brands
Powdered drink mixes